Monica Løken is a Norwegian handball player. She played twelve matches for the Norway women's national handball team in 1994 and 1995.  She participated at the 1994 European Women's Handball Championship, where the Norwegian team placed third.

References

Year of birth missing (living people)
Living people
Norwegian female handball players
21st-century Norwegian women